The Peel Thunder Football Club is an Australian rules football club playing in the West Australian Football League (WAFL) and WAFL Women's (WAFLW). The team is based in Mandurah, Western Australia, with their home ground being Rushton Park. The club joined the WAFL as an expansion team in 1997.

Since 2014 Peel have been in a formal alignment with the Fremantle Dockers of the Australian Football League, an arrangement which sees Fremantle's reserve players play for Peel.

History
Peel Thunder Football Club was formed in 1996 after the West Australian Football Commission (WAFC) granted a ninth licence in the WAFL to the Mandurah-Peel region. The licence was issued on the condition that the club be ready to compete in the 1997 Westar Rules season. Geoff Miles was appointed as the club's inaugural coach and Phil Gilbert appointed captain. The Thunder managed just one win in 1997 and finished last on the ladder, with Scott Simister winning the inaugural best and fairest. They managed another one-win season in 1998, before going winless in 1999.

In March 2011, the club was fined $10,000 for breaching salary cap rules involving player payments to midfielder Rory O'Brien during the 2009 season.

Between 1997 and 2014, the Thunder failed to qualify for the finals, with their best season coming in 2008 when they recorded an 8–12 win–loss record and a sixth-place finish. During that time, they collected nine wooden spoons, including three in a row twice (1997–99 & 2011–13), and finished second last seven times.

In 2014, Peel became directly aligned with the Fremantle Dockers of the Australian Football League, an arrangement which saw Fremantle's reserve players playing exclusively for Peel in the WAFL for the first time. In 2015, the second season of this arrangement, Peel qualified for the finals for the first time in its history, finishing third on the ladder with a club-best record of 13–7. Due to Fremantle's decision to rest a host of its key AFL players ahead of their finals campaign, the majority of Peel's usual Fremantle contingent was called up for AFL duties, which impacted Peel's ability to field a competitive team against West Perth in the qualifying final. As a result, Peel was blown out of the water by West Perth, losing their first finals game 145–36. Despite regaining many of their Fremantle players for their semi-final clash against East Perth the following week, they were knocked out of the finals with an 84–62 defeat at the hands of the Royals.

In 2016, the Thunder finished the home and away season in fourth place on the ladder with an 11–9 record. Despite a drop off from 2015, Peel headed into the WAFL finals with a huge boost thanks to Fremantle's poor season in 2016. With Fremantle missing the finals in 2016, it provided Peel with a huge contingent of players for their finals campaign. Behind 17 Docker-listed players, the Thunder won three do-or-die finals in a row against East Perth, West Perth and South Fremantle respectively to reach their first ever WAFL grand final. In the grand final, Peel defeated Subiaco by 23 points to win their first WAFL premiership. Peel's midfield had too much running power and grunt inside for Subiaco, with Docker Connor Blakely winning the Simpson Medal on the back of 38 possessions. Fellow Docker Ed Langdon was also an important contributor with 39 disposals, eight marks and a goal.

Peel were a foundation member of the WAFL Women's competition in 2019. The club recorded their first senior women's premiership in the competition in the 2020 season.

Honour board

Honours

Club honours

Individual honours 
Sandover Medallists: (2) 2002: Allistair Pickett, 2008: Hayden Ballantyne
Simpson Medallists: (2) 2016: Connor Blakely, 2017: Luke Ryan

Records
Highest score: Round 11, 2001 – 23.11 (149) vs. Swan Districts at Bendigo Bank Stadium
Lowest score (official): Round 1, 2004 – 0.0 (0) vs. Claremont at Rushton Park – the team's on-field score of 10.10 (70) was annulled for playing Peter Bird with an invalid permit
Lowest score (on-field) : Round 16, 2016 – 1.5 (11) vs. West Perth
Greatest winning margin: Round 2, 2017 – 86 points vs. East Fremantle at Bendigo Bank Stadium
Greatest losing margin: Round 3, 1999 – 195 points vs. South Fremantle at Fremantle Oval

Source: WAFL.com.au

AFL draftees
The following is a list of Peel Thunder players who have been drafted to clubs in the Australian Football League (AFL). Players currently on an AFL list are listed in bold:

Source: PeelThunder.com.au

References

External links

 

 
West Australian Football League clubs
WAFL Women's
Sport in Mandurah
Australian rules football clubs in Western Australia
Australian rules football clubs established in 1996
1996 establishments in Australia
Australian Reserve team football